Early One Morning is a 2015 novel by Virginia Baily.

Synopsis
In 1944 in Rome, Italy, a woman named Chiara Ravello rescues Daniele Levi, a Jewish child, before he is deported by the Nazis with his mother. In a flash-forward, Chiara lives alone in Rome in the 1970s and reflects on her life.

Critical reception
Reviewing it for The Guardian, Samantha Harvey described the novel as "incredibly sure-footed, a big, generous and absorbing piece of storytelling, fearless, witty and full of flair." She added that it was "a surprisingly humorous novel, in which the characters are tenderly mocked or mock themselves". In The Scotsman, Allan Massie suggested some passages "might with advantage have been shortened", but he concluded that the novel was "engrossing".

However, in another review for The Guardian, Lucy Scholes suggested the conclusion was "a little flat". In The Independent, Julie McDowall agreed with Scholes, writing that the "ending is tied up far too fast to be satisfying" Reviewing it for The National, Clare Dight also criticized the end, arguing: "The reader’s most serious criticism will come on the last page, however, when the ink runs out before a final reckoning." Meanwhile, in The Jewish Chronicle, Hephzibah Anderson regretted that Bailey did not write more about the Holocaust, and she concluded: "Baily's decision to look away from the horrors that she nonetheless exploits is a cop-out."

References

2015 British novels
English-language novels
Novels set in Rome
Novels about the aftermath of the Holocaust
Little, Brown and Company books